Silvia Bertolaccini (born 30 January 1950) is an Argentine professional golfer who played on the LPGA Tour.

Bertolaccini was born in Rafaela, Santa Fe. She won the Argentine and Colombian amateur championships before turning professional and moving to the United States to play on the LPGA Tour in 1975. She won four times on the LPGA Tour between 1977 and 1984.

Bertolaccini has worked as a commentator for ESPN Deportes since 1996.

Amateur wins (2)
1972 Argentine National Amateur
1974 Colombian National Amateur

Professional wins (7)

LPGA Tour wins (4)

Other wins (3)
1975 Kansas City Open (USA)
1977 Singapore Open
1979 Philippine Open

References

Argentine female golfers
LPGA Tour golfers
Sportspeople from Santa Fe Province
People from Rafaela
1950 births
Living people
20th-century Argentine women